Excess All Areas may refer to:

 Excess All Areas (Kevin Bloody Wilson album), 2009
 Excess All Areas (Shy album), 1987
 Excess All Areas (Scooter album), 2006
 Happy Mondays – Excess All Areas: A Biography, a book on Happy Mondays